Hatiro Shimomoto (18 December 1935 – 21 June 2021) was a Brazilian politician and lawyer from the state of São Paulo.

Biography 
He was a member of the Legislative Assembly of São Paulo.

On 21 June 2021, Shimomoto died at São Paulo, at the age of 85 due to complications brought on by COVID-19.

References 

People from São Paulo
1935 births
2021 deaths
Brazilian people of Japanese descent
Brazilian politicians of Japanese descent
Members of the Legislative Assembly of São Paulo
Deaths from the COVID-19 pandemic in São Paulo (state)

Democrats (Brazil) politicians
Reform Progressive Party politicians
Democratic Social Party politicians
National Renewal Alliance politicians